Vrtoče is a village in the municipality of Bosanski Petrovac, Bosnia and Herzegovina.

Demographics 
According to the 2013 census, its population was 176.

References

Populated places in Bosanski Petrovac